Promise and Terror is the fifth studio album by English heavy metal band Blaze Bayley, released in 2010. It is the second studio album released by the band since they changed their name from Blaze, and the last album which Blaze Bayley established as the band, before Bayley himself decided to change the format as a solo artist for his subsequent albums. It is also the first Blaze Bayley album without a title track.

Themes 
The songs on Promise and Terror are very diverse in their themes; the first half of the album is more upbeat and positive, but the second half is darker and more introspective. "Surrounded by Sadness", the first acoustic song since the band changed their name, starts a four-song run-in, as the last songs on the album are thematically connected. As stated in the sleeve notes inside the album cover, the last four songs follow the four steps of dealing with personal tragedy: loss, pain, grief and acceptance. These songs mostly address the loss of Bayley's wife and the struggle he and the band have had in the music world.

Reception 

The pre-sale for Promise and Terror quickly became the biggest in Blaze Bayley's history, as it charted at number 3 on UK pre-orders before its release. Blaze Bayley himself has stated that Promise and Terror is his best-selling solo album to date.

Professional reviews for the album have ranged from positive to enthusiastic.

Track listing 
 "Watching the Night Sky" – 3:36
 "Madness and Sorrow" – 3:09
 "1633" – 6:03
 "God of Speed" – 5:48
 "City of Bones" – 6:26
 "Faceless" – 3:46
 "Time to Dare" – 5:41
 "Surrounded by Sadness" – 3:59
 "The Trace of Things That Have No Words" – 5:48
 "Letting Go of the World" – 6:24
 "Comfortable in Darkness" – 4:29

Personnel 
Blaze Bayley – vocals
Nico Bermudez – lead guitar
Jay Walsh – rhythm guitar
David Bermudez – bass
Lawrence Paterson – drums
Jase Edwards – producer, first guitar solo on Madness and Sorrow.

References 

Blaze Bayley albums
2010 albums